TT Aquilae (TT Aql) is a Classical Cepheid (δ Cep) variable star in the constellation Aquila.

The visual apparent magnitude of TT Aql ranges from 6.52 to 7.65 over 13.7546 days.  The light curve is asymmetric, with the rise from minimum to maximum brightness only taking half the time of the fall from maximum to minimum.

TT Aql is a yellow-white supergiant around five thousand times brighter than the sun. It pulsates and varies in temperature between about 5,000 K and 6,000 K, and the spectral type varies between F6 and G5.

Cepheid masses can be estimated using Baade-Wesselink relations and this gives . The discrepancies between the masses obtained by the different methods occurs for most Cepheid variables.

References

External links
 INTEGRAL-OMC catalogue

Aquila (constellation)
Classical Cepheid variables
178359
Aquilae, TT
F-type supergiants
G-type supergiants
093390
Durchmusterung objects